Dam betulim (Literally in Hebrew: "blood [of the] virgin[al]") refers to the emission of vaginal blood that is often exuded upon the first time a woman has sexual intercourse and the her hymen is penetrated. After the blood exudes, the woman becomes a niddah, and the couple must refrain from further sexual intercourse until the woman completes her next period cycle. For this reason, it has sometimes been practice for couples to refrain from sexual intercourse until several days after marriage in order to be able to remain physically intimate for a longer period directly following the wedding.

References

Jewish marital law
Jewish ritual purity law
Mishnah
Talmud
Menstrual cycle
Judaism and sexuality
Jewish life cycle
Hebrew words and phrases in Jewish law